Moreno Boer (born 9 January 1977 ) is an Italian weightlifter. He was born in Pordenone. He is a member of the weightlifting team for Gruppo Sportivo Fiamme Oro, and is coached and trained by Angelo Mannironi. Boer made his official debut for the 2000 Summer Olympics in Sydney, where he hauled 365.0 kilograms in total for a twelfth-place finish in the men's heavyweight class (105 kg).

Biography
Eight years after competing in his last Olympics, Boer qualified for his second Italian team, as a 30-year-old, at the 2008 Summer Olympics in Beijing, by finishing twenty-fourth and obtaining a place from the 2007 World Weightlifting Championships in Chiang Mai, Thailand. Boer placed eighteenth in the men's 105 kg class, as he successfully lifted 150 kg in the single-motion snatch, and hoisted 170 kg in the two-part, shoulder-to-overhead clean and jerk, for a total of 330 kg. Boer was later elevated to a higher position, when Ukraine's Ihor Razoronov had been disqualified from the Games, after he tested positive for nandrolone.

References

External links
 

1977 births
Living people
Italian male weightlifters
Olympic weightlifters of Italy
Weightlifters at the 2000 Summer Olympics
Weightlifters at the 2008 Summer Olympics
People from Pordenone
Mediterranean Games silver medalists for Italy
Mediterranean Games medalists in weightlifting
Competitors at the 2001 Mediterranean Games
Weightlifters of Fiamme Oro
Sportspeople from Friuli-Venezia Giulia
20th-century Italian people
21st-century Italian people